The Eurovision Young Musicians 1996 was the eighth edition of the Eurovision Young Musicians, held at Centro Cultural de Belém in Lisbon, Portugal on 12 June 1996. Organised by the European Broadcasting Union (EBU) and host broadcaster Rádio e Televisão de Portugal (RTP), musicians from eight countries participated in the televised final. Out of the 22 countries, 14 did not qualify to the final, including the host country Portugal. All participants performed a classical piece of their choice accompanied by the Portuguese Symphony Orchestra, conducted by Luis Izquierdo.

For the fourth time, the host country did not qualify for the final. Julia Fischer of Germany won the contest, with Austria and Estonia placing second and third respectively.

Location

Cultural Centre of Belém (Portuguese: Centro Cultural de Belém), a cultural centre in Lisbon, Portugal, was the host venue for the 1996 edition of the Eurovision Young Musicians.

Located in the civil parish of Santa Maria de Belém (in the municipality of Lisbon), it is the largest building with cultural facilities in Portugal. The CCB's 140,000 m2 spaces was initially built to accommodate the European Presidency, but adapted to provide spaces for conferences, exhibitions and artistic venues (such as opera, ballet and symphony concerts), in addition to political and research congresses, high security meeting halls, and a 7,000 m2 exhibition area.

Results

Preliminary round
A total of twenty-two countries took part in the preliminary round of the 1996 contest, of which eight qualified to the televised grand final. The following countries failed to qualify.

 Cyprus
 (Cello)

 (host)

Final 
Awards were given to the top three countries. The table below highlights these using gold, silver, and bronze. The placing results of the remaining participants is unknown and never made public by the European Broadcasting Union.

Broadcasting
EBU members from the following countries broadcast the final round.

See also
 Eurovision Song Contest 1996

References

External links 
 

Eurovision Young Musicians by year
1996 in music
1996 in Portugal
Music festivals in Portugal
Events in Lisbon
June 1996 events in Europe